Odyniec (Polish for "Boar") is a Polish coat of arms. It was used by several szlachta (noble) families under the Polish–Lithuanian Commonwealth.

History

Blazon

Notable bearers
Notable bearers of this coat of arms have included:
 Antoni Edward Odyniec, writer (1804–1885)
 Zygmunt Bohusz-Szyszko, Inspector General of the Armed Forces of Poland (1893–1982)

Notes

See also
 Polish heraldry
 Heraldry
 Coat of arms

Polish coats of arms